Mercedes de Lasala de Riglos or (incorrectly) Ana Lasala de Riglos (23 September 1764 – 1 January 1837), known as Madame Riglos, was an Argentinian patriot and socialite during the period when Argentina was gaining its independence from Spain. 
Her home was a meeting place where information could be exchanged and the issues of the day discussed.
In 1823 she was one of the founders of the famous philanthropic society Sociedad de Beneficencia de Buenos Aires and served as its first president.

Family

María Josefa de las Mercedes Lasala Fernández Larrazabal was born in Buenos Aires on 23 September 1764 and baptised two days later.
She was from an old patrician family.
Her father was Jean Baptiste de La Salle Bachaulet (8 February 1729 – c. 1780), originally from Monein, Bearn, France.
Her mother was Juana Agustina Fernandez de la Cruz Larrazabal, born on 5 May 1741 in Buenos Aires.
Mercedes was the second oldest of a family of at least 10 children.
Her youngest sister was Maria Eusebia Rafaela Jossefa (1774–1854).

On 13 April 1782 Mercedes de Lasala married Miguel Fermín Mariano Riglos San Martín (12 October 1754 – 16 May 1808) in Buenos Aires.
He was a captain of dragoons in the Fixed Regiment.
Their children were Miguel Francisco Xavier Julián Buenaventura (17 February 1783), Josefa Rosa Mercedes Dionisia (2 March 1784 – 5 Jan 1873), Miguel José Sabelio (9 January 1790 – 20 Nov 1863), José Ramón Francisco (1 April 1791), Martín Marcos José (12 November 1793), Ramón Doroteo Ignacio (6 February 1795), José Martín Ramón Buenaventura (30 January 1797 – 22 February 1839) and Francisca Javiera (died  28 July 1862).
Her husband died in 1809.

Support for independence movement

Mercedes was known among the ladies of Buenos Aires for her determined patriotism.
She belonged to the Patricias Argentinas, a group of female financiers who contributed in financing the Argentine War of Independence in 1812.
Her sister, Eusebia de Lasala, was part of the commission that interviewed Cornelio Saavedra and convinced him to participate in the freedom movement.
In 1810 Mercedes contributed three ounces of gold to support the First Upper Peru campaign.
Eusebia contributed one ounce of gold.

Tertulias

Mercedes de Riglos was among the well-to-do women of Buenos Aires who held weekly social gatherings that were open to anyone introduced by a friend.
Similar tertulias were being held during this period in Lima, Peru, by women such as Manuela Rábago de Avellafuertes de Riglos and Narcisa Arias de Saavaedra.
It was at meetings at her house and those of other society women such as Mariquita Sánchez de Thompson and Flora Azcuénaga that the discussions were held which led up to the May Revolution, the first stage in the struggle for Argentine independence from Spain.
William Parish Robertson, an English merchant, visited Buenos Aires around the end of 1817.
He wrote much later, 

"Madame Riglos" could be seen as the chief lady of the conservative faction in Buenos Aires.
She was sparkling and familiar, although highly aristocratic.
Her house was the meeting place of government figures.
She was popular with English naval officers because of her patience in correcting their linguistic errors and her willingness to defend them against criticism for their sad figure in the local dances.
Doña Melchora de Sarratea, queen of fashion and of the Buenos Aires salons, was so well aware of public and private affairs that she was held to be an enthusiastic supporter of Whig (liberal) principles.
Mariquita Sánchez de Thompson's forte was foreign relations. 
She had great wealth and collected outstanding personalities and also exquisite and curious products of European art and industry such as porcelains, engravings and clocks.

Charity

Mercedes Lasala was one of the founders of the Sociedad de Beneficencia (Charity Society) created by Bernardino Rivadavia in 1823. 
She was the first president of the society, holding office until January 1827.
The society ran public institutions to help women and children, and played an important role in female education.
She worked to promote the society until her death.
Mercedes de Lasala de Riglos died in Buenos Aires on 1 January 1837.

Balcón de Riglos

Mercedes Lasala de Riglos's son, Miguel de Riglos y Lasala, was educated in London and returned to Buenos Aires in February 1813 at the age of 21.
Don Miguel de Riglos y Lasala was known as the "English Lord".
On 11 February 1825 Colonel Manuel de Escalada sold a house on the Plaza de la Victoria to Miguel de Riglos y Lasala as agent of his brother-in-law José de San Martín, who was absent in Europe.
The house had been given to San Martín by the state on 16 August 1819, and was sold for $20,000 cash.
It was a few meters from the Buenos Aires Cabildo.
It came to be known as the "Balcón de Riglos".
Others called it called "Los Altos".
Miguel and his wife Doña Dolores Villanueva furnished the house with all the luxury and comfort of the time.
For more than 30 years the long and narrow balcony of the house was the place from which the best society viewed every parade or procession.

Notes

Citations

Sources

 

1764 births
1837 deaths
18th-century Argentine people
19th-century Argentine people
Argentine philanthropists
18th-century Argentine women
19th-century Argentine women